Keegan Daniel O'Toole (born May 9, 2001) is an American freestyle and folkstyle wrestler who competes internationally at 74 kilograms and collegiately at 165 pounds. In freestyle, he was the 2021 Junior World Champion. In folkstyle, he is an NCAA Division I All-American and Mid-American Conference champion out of the University of Missouri. On March 19, 2022, wrestling as the NO. 2 seed for Mizzou, O'Toole won his first NCAA national championship at the 165-lb. weight class by defeating defending national champion Shane Griffith of Stanford. O'Toole finished the season 28-0. He was listed as a freshman for his 2021-2022 campaign due to the pandemic year of 2020-2021 and will have three more opportunities to become a repeat national champ.

Background 
Born and raised in the state of Wisconsin, O'Toole attended Arrowhead High School in Hartland, graduating in 2020 as the second-ranked recruit in the nation. During his time as a high school wrestler, O'Toole went on to become the eighteenth athlete to claim four WIAA state titles, going 49–0 as a senior. He cemented his spot as the top-ranked 160 pounder with a technical fall over former #1 Paddy Gallgher. Before attending the University of Missouri (NCAA Division I), he was named the Junior Dan Hodge Trophy and Wisconsin's Dave Schultz High School Excellence award winner.

Collegiate career

2020–2021 
Missouri's O'Toole racked up a perfect 13–0 record NCAAs competing solely along the Mid-American Conference due to COVID-19 restrictions. At the NCAA tournament, he advanced to the quarterfinals with two more wins, but was knocked off to consolation by eventual finalist and third-seeded Jake Wentzel from Pittsburgh. After his first win on consolations, he stunned second-ranked Anthony Valencia from ASU by technical fall and fifth-ranked Zach Hartman from Bucknell by major decision before claiming the bronze medal by downing tenth-seeded Travis Wittlake from the Oklahoma State University, becoming an All-American.

Freestyle career

Age-group level 
After winning multiple US National titles in freestyle, O'Toole claimed the 2021 Junior World Championship with a technical fall in the finale, notoriously pinning '19 U23 World Champion Turan Bayramov in the quarterfinals.

NCAA record 

! colspan="8"| NCAA Division I Matches
|-
!  Res.
!  Record
!  Opponent
!  Score
!  Date
!  Event
|-
|Win
|21–1
|align=left| Nick Knutson 
|style="font-size:88%"|Fall
|style="font-size:88%"|November 14, 2021
|style="font-size:88%"|Northern Colorado - Missouri Dual	
|-
|Win
|20–1
|align=left| Luke Weber 
|style="font-size:88%"|Fall
|style="font-size:88%"|November 11, 2021
|style="font-size:88%"|Missouri - North Dakota State Dual	
|-
! style=background:lighgrey colspan=6 |Start of 2021–2022 Season (sophomore year)
|-
! style=background:lighgrey colspan=6 |End of 2020–2021 Season (freshman year)
|-
! style=background:white colspan=6 |2021 NCAA Championships  at 165 lbs
|-
|Win
|19–1
|align=left| Travis Wittlake
|style="font-size:88%"|4–3
|style="font-size:88%" rowspan=7|March 18–20, 2021
|style="font-size:88%" rowspan=7|2021 NCAA Division I National Championships
|-
|Win
|18–1
|align=left| Zach Hartman
|style="font-size:88%"|MD 17–4
|-
|Win
|17–1
|align=left| Anthony Valencia
|style="font-size:88%"|TF 16–1
|-
|Win
|16–1
|align=left| Luke Weber
|style="font-size:88%"|5–1
|-
|Loss
|15–1
|align=left|Jake Wentzell
|style="font-size:88%"|6–9
|-
|Win
|15–0
|align=left| Cameron Amine
|style="font-size:88%"|5–2
|-
|Win
|14–0
|align=left| Jake Silverstein
|style="font-size:88%"|Fall
|-
! style=background:white colspan=6 | 2021 MAC Championships  at 165 lbs
|-
|Win
|13–0
|align=left| Izzak Olejnik
|style="font-size:88%"|6–2
|style="font-size:88%" rowspan=4|February 26–27, 2021
|style="font-size:88%" rowspan=4|2021 Mid-American Conference Championships
|-
|Win
|12–0
|align=left| Alex Cramer
|style="font-size:88%"|MD 13–2
|-
|Win
|11–0
|align=left| Neil Schuster
|style="font-size:88%"|Fall
|-
|Win
|10–0
|align=left| James Limongi
|style="font-size:88%"|Fall
|-
|Win
|9–0
|align=left| Chase Diehl
|style="font-size:88%"|TF 21–6
|style="font-size:88%"|February 7, 2021
|style="font-size:88%"|Southern Illinois Edwardsville - Missouri Dual
|-
|Win
|8–0
|align=left| Izzak Olejnik 
|style="font-size:88%"|5–1
|style="font-size:88%" rowspan=2|January 23, 2021
|style="font-size:88%"|Northern Illinois - Missouri Dual	
|-
|Win
|7–0
|align=left| Sean O'Dwyer 
|style="font-size:88%"|Fall
|style="font-size:88%"|Ohio - Missouri Dual		
|-
|Win
|6–0
|align=left| Grant Stotts 
|style="font-size:88%"|Fall
|style="font-size:88%" rowspan=2|January 17, 2021
|style="font-size:88%"|Missouri - Iowa State Dual		
|-
|Win
|5–0
|align=left| Pat Schoenfelder  
|style="font-size:88%"|TF 20–4
|style="font-size:88%"|Missouri - Northern Iowa Dual	
|-
|Win
|4–0
|align=left| Cole Moody 
|style="font-size:88%"|12–6
|style="font-size:88%" rowspan=2|January 8, 2021
|style="font-size:88%"|Wyoming - Missouri Dual		
|-
|Win
|3–0
|align=left| Alex Cramer 
|style="font-size:88%"|TF 21–5
|style="font-size:88%"|Central Michigan - Missouri Dual		
|-
|Win
|2–0
|align=left| Jack Thomsen 
|style="font-size:88%"|TF 18–3
|style="font-size:88%" rowspan=2|January 3, 2021
|style="font-size:88%"|SDSU/Missouri/NDSU Extra Matches	
|-
|Win
|1–0
|align=left| Cade DeVos 
|style="font-size:88%"|Fall
|style="font-size:88%"|South Dakota State - Missouri Dual	
|-
! style=background:lighgrey colspan=6 |Start of 2020–2021 Season (freshman year)

Stats 

!  Season
!  Year
!  School
!  Rank
!  Record
!  Weigh Class
!  Win
!  Bonus
|-
|2022
|Sophomore
|rowspan=2|University of Missouri
|#4
|2–0
|rowspan=2|165
|100.00%
|100.00%
|-
|2021
|Freshman
|#6 (3rd)
|19–1
|95.00%
|65.00%
|-
|colspan=5 bgcolor="LIGHTGREY"|Career
|bgcolor="LIGHTGREY"|21–1
|bgcolor="LIGHTGREY"|95.45%
|bgcolor="LIGHTGREY"|68.18%

References 

2001 births
Living people
American male sport wrestlers
Missouri Tigers wrestlers
People from Hartland, Wisconsin
Sportspeople from the Milwaukee metropolitan area